Methyldiphenylphosphine is the organophosphine with the formula CH3(C6H5)2P, often abbreviated PMePh2.  It is a colorless, viscous liquid.  It is a member of series (CH3)3-n(C6H5)2P that also includes n = 0,  n = 1, and  n = 3 that are often employed as ligands in metal phosphine complexes.

Methyldiphenylphosphine is prepared by reaction of chlorodiphenylphosphine with methyl Grignard reagent:
Cl(C6H5)2P  +  CH3MgBr  →   CH3(C6H5)2P  +  MgBrCl

Selected derivatives:
The phosphine oxide OPMePh2, prepared by treatment with hydrogen peroxide.
The coordination complex MoH4(PMePh2)4, prepared by treatment of MoCl4(PMePh2)2 with sodium borohydride in the presence of excess ligand.
The coordination complex CoCl2(PMePh2)2, prepared by treating cobalt(II) chloride with the phosphine.
The phosphine-borane H3BPMePh2 prepared by treating the phosphine with borane.

References

Tertiary phosphines
Phenyl compounds